The Ministry of Finance is a Swedish government ministry responsible for matters relating to economic policy, the central government budget, taxes, banking, security and insurance, international economic work, central, regional and local government.

The ministry has a staff of 490, of whom only 20 are political appointees. The political executive is made up of three ministers: the Minister for Finance currently Elisabeth Svantesson (m), the Minister for Financial Markets currently Niklas Wykman (m) and the Minister for Public Administration currently Erik Slottner (kd).

The ministry offices are located at Drottninggatan 21 in central Stockholm.

Government agencies
The Ministry of Finance is principal for the following government agencies:

Areas of responsibility
 Financial markets
 Central government budget
 International cooperation
 Local authorities
 Taxes

References

External links 
 Ministry of Finance, official website 

Finance
Sweden
Public finance of Sweden